The Union of South Africa was the historical predecessor to the present-day Republic of South Africa. It came into existence on 31 May 1910 with the unification of the Cape, Natal, Transvaal, and Orange River colonies. It included the territories that were formerly a part of the South African Republic and the Orange Free State.

Following World War I, the Union of South Africa was a signatory of the Treaty of Versailles and became one of the founding members of the League of Nations. It was conferred the administration of South West Africa (now known as Namibia) as a League of Nations mandate. It became treated in most respects as another province of the Union, but it never was formally annexed.

Like Canada, Australia and New Zealand, the Union of South Africa was a self-governing dominion of the British Empire. Its full sovereignty was confirmed with the Balfour Declaration of 1926 and the Statute of Westminster 1931. It was governed under a form of constitutional monarchy, with the Crown being represented by a governor-general. The Union came to an end with the enactment of the constitution of 1961, by which it became a republic and left the Commonwealth of Nations. The Republic of South Africa rejoined the Commonwealth in 1994.

Constitution

Main features

The Union of South Africa was a unitary state, rather than a federation like Canada and Australia, with each colony's parliaments being abolished and replaced with provincial councils. A bicameral parliament was created, consisting of the House of Assembly and Senate, with members of the parliament being elected mostly by the country's white minority. During the course of the Union, the franchise changed on several occasions always to suit the needs of the government of the day. Parliamentary supremacy was a convention of the constitution, inherited from the United Kingdom; save for procedural safeguards in respect of the entrenched sections of franchise and language, the courts were unable to intervene in Parliament's decisions.

Capitals

Owing to disagreements over where the Union's capital should be, a compromise was reached in which every province would be dealt a share of the benefits of the capital: the administration would be seated in Pretoria (Transvaal), the Parliament would be in Cape Town (Cape Province), the Appellate Division would be in Bloemfontein (Orange Free State), while archives would be in Pietermaritzburg (Natal). Bloemfontein and Pietermaritzburg were given financial compensation. Since South West Africa was never officially annexed as a fifth province, its capital, Windhoek, was never officially recognized as the country's fifth capital.

Relationship to the Crown

The Union initially remained under the British Crown as a self-governing dominion of the British Empire. With the passage of the Statute of Westminster in 1931, the Union and other dominions became equal in status to the United Kingdom, and the Parliament of the United Kingdom could no longer legislate on behalf of them. This had the effect of making the Union and the other dominions de jure sovereign nations. The Status of the Union Act, passed by the South African Parliament in 1934, incorporated the applicable portions of the Statute of Westminster into South African law, underscoring its status as a sovereign nation. It removed what remaining authority Whitehall had to legislate for South Africa, as well as any nominal role that the United Kingdom had in granting Royal Assent. The governor-general was now required to sign or veto bills passed by Parliament, without the option of seeking advice from London.

The monarch was represented in South Africa by a governor-general, while effective power was exercised by the Executive Council, headed by the prime minister. Louis Botha, formerly a Boer general, was appointed first prime minister of the Union, heading a coalition representing the white Afrikaner and English-speaking British diaspora communities.
Prosecutions before courts were instituted in the name of the Crown (cited in the format Rex v Accused) and government officials served in the name of the Crown.

Languages

An entrenched clause in the Constitution mentioned Dutch and English as official languages of the Union, but the meaning of Dutch was changed by the Official Languages of the Union Act, 1925 to include both Dutch and Afrikaans.

Final days of the South Africa Act and legacy

Most English-speaking whites in South Africa supported the United Party of Jan Smuts, which favoured close relations with the United Kingdom and the Commonwealth, unlike the Afrikaans-speaking National Party, which had held anti-British sentiments and was opposed to South Africa's intervention in the Second World War. Some Nationalist organisations, like the Ossewa Brandwag, were openly supportive of Nazi Germany during the Second World War.

Most English-speaking South Africans were opposed to the creation of a republic, many of them voting "no" in the 5 October 1960 referendum. But due to the much larger number of Afrikaans-speaking voters, the referendum passed, leading to the establishment of a republic in 1961. The government led by the National Party consequently withdrew South Africa from the Commonwealth. Following the results of the referendum, some whites in Natal, which had an English-speaking majority, called for secession from the Union. Five years earlier, some 33,000 Natalians had signed the Natal Covenant in opposition to the plans for a republic.

Subsequently, the National Party government had passed a Constitution that repealed the South Africa Act. The features of the Union were carried over with very little change to the newly formed Republic. The decision to transform from a Union to Republic was narrowly decided in the referendum. The decision together with the South African Government's insistence on adhering to its policy of apartheid resulted in South Africa's de facto expulsion from the Commonwealth of Nations.

Segregation

The South Africa Act dealt with race in two specific provisions. First it entrenched the liberal (by South African standards) Cape Qualified Franchise system of the Cape Colony which operated free of any racial considerations (although due to socio-economic restrictions no real political expression of non-whites was possible). The Cape Prime Minister at the time, John X. Merriman, fought hard, but ultimately unsuccessfully, to extend this system of multi-racial franchise to the rest of South Africa.

Second it made "native affairs" a matter for the national government. The practice therefore was to establish a Minister of Native Affairs.

According to Stephen Howe, "colonialism in some cases—most obviously among white minorities in South Africa—meant mainly that these violent settlers wanted to maintain more racial inequalities than the colonial empire found just".

Previous attempts at unification

Several previous unsuccessful attempts to unite the colonies were made, with proposed political models ranging from unitary, to loosely federal.

Early unification attempt under Sir George Grey (1850s)

Sir George Grey, the Governor of Cape Colony from 1854 to 1861, decided that unifying the states of southern Africa would be mutually beneficial. The stated reasons were that he believed that political divisions between the white-controlled states "weakened them against the natives", threatened an ethnic divide between British and Boer, and left the Cape vulnerable to interference from other European powers. He believed that a united "South African Federation", under British control, would resolve all three of these concerns.

His idea was greeted with cautious optimism in southern Africa; the Orange Free State agreed to the idea in principle and the Transvaal may also eventually have agreed. However, he was overruled by the British Colonial Office which ordered him to desist from his plans. His refusal to abandon the idea eventually led to him being recalled.

The imposition of confederation (1870s)
In the 1870s, the London Colonial Office, under Secretary for the Colonies Lord Carnarvon, decided to apply a system of Confederation onto southern Africa. On this occasion, however, it was largely rejected by southern Africans, primarily due to its very bad timing. The various component states of southern Africa were still simmering after the last bout of British expansion, and inter-state tensions were high. The Orange Free State this time refused to even discuss the idea, and Prime Minister John Molteno of the Cape Colony called the idea badly informed and irresponsible. In addition, many local leaders resented the way it was imposed from outside without understanding of local issues. The Confederation model was also correctly seen as unsuitable for the disparate entities of southern Africa, with their wildly different sizes, economies and political systems.

The Molteno Unification Plan (1877), put forward by the Cape government as a more feasible unitary alternative to confederation, largely anticipated the final act of Union in 1909. A crucial difference was that the Cape's liberal constitution and multiracial franchise were to be extended to the other states of the union. These smaller states would gradually accede to the much larger Cape Colony through a system of treaties, whilst simultaneously gaining elected seats in the Cape parliament. The entire process would be locally driven, with Britain's role restricted to policing any set-backs. While subsequently acknowledged to be more viable, this model was rejected at the time by London. At the other extreme, another powerful Cape politician at the time, Saul Solomon, proposed an extremely loose system of federation, with the component states preserving their very different constitutions and systems of franchise.

Lord Carnarvon rejected the (more informed) local plans for unification, as he wished to have the process brought to a conclusion before the end of his tenure and, having little experience of southern Africa, he preferred to enforce the more familiar model of confederation used in Canada. He pushed ahead with his Confederation plan, which unraveled as predicted, leaving a string of destructive wars across southern Africa. These conflicts eventually fed into the first and second Anglo-Boer Wars, with far-reaching consequences for the subcontinent.

Second Boer War (1899–1902)

After the discovery of gold in the 1880s, thousands of British immigrants flocked to the gold mines of the Transvaal Republic and the Orange Free State. The newly arrived miners, though needed for the mines, were distrusted by the politically dominant Afrikaners, who called them "uitlanders", imposed heavy taxes on them and granted them very limited civil rights, with no right to vote. The British government, interested in profiting from the gold and diamond mines there and highly protective of its own citizens, demanded reforms, which the Afrikaners rejected. A small-scale private British effort to overthrow Transvaal's President Paul Kruger, the Jameson Raid of 1895, proved a fiasco, and presaged full-scale conflict as diplomatic efforts all failed.

The Second Boer War started on 11 October 1899 and ended on 31 May 1902. The United Kingdom gained the support of its Cape Colony, of its Colony of Natal and of some African allies. Volunteers from across the British Empire further supplemented the British war effort. All other nations remained neutral, but public opinion in them was largely hostile to Britain. Inside Britain and its Empire there was also significant opposition to the Second Boer War, spearheaded by anti-war activists such as Emily Hobhouse.

At the onset of the war, the British were both overconfident about the chances of success in a military confrontation with the Boer republics and underprepared for a long-term conflict. British Prime Minister Lord Salisbury and members of his cabinet, in particular Colonial Secretary Joseph Chamberlain, ignored repeated warnings that Boer forces were more powerful than previous reports had suggested. In the last months of 1899, Boer forces launched the first attacks of the war, besieging the British-held settlements of Ladysmith, Kimberley and Mafeking, and winning several engagements against British troops at Colenso, Magersfontein and Stormberg. However, by the next year the British soon organized an effective response to these attacks, lifting the three sieges and winning several battles against Boer forces. The British, now deploying approximately 400,000 soldiers from across their colonial empire, successfully invaded and occupied the Boer republics. Numerous Boer soldiers refused to surrender and took to the countryside to carry out guerrilla operations against the British, who responded by implementing scorched earth tactics. These tactics included interning Afrikaner civilians from the Boer republics in concentration camps (in which roughly 28,000 people died) and destroying homesteads owned by Afrikaners to flush out the guerillas and deny them a base of civilian support. Using these tactics combined with a system of blockhouses and barriers to seal off Boer holdouts, the British were able to gradually track down and defeat the guerillas. In the 1902 Treaty of Vereeniging, the British formally annexed the Boer republics into the Cape Colony, ending the war.

History of the Union of South Africa

National Convention
The National Convention was a constitutional convention held between 1908 and 1909 in Durban (12 October to 5 November 1908), Cape Town (23 November to 18 December 1908, 11 January to 3 February 1909) and Bloemfontein (3 to 11 May 1909). This convention led to the British Parliament's adoption of the South Africa Act, which ratified the Union. The four colonies that would become South Africa were represented, along with a delegation from Rhodesia. The 33 delegates assembled behind closed doors, in the fear that a public affair would lead delegates to refuse compromising on contentious areas. The delegates drew up a constitution that would, subject to some amendments by the British government, become the South Africa Act, which was South Africa's constitution between 1910 and 1961, when the country became a republic under the Constitution of 1961.

Union of South Africa and Southern Rhodesia

In 1922 the colony of Southern Rhodesia had a chance (but ultimately rejected) to join the Union through a referendum. The referendum resulted from the fact that by 1920 British South Africa Company rule in Southern Rhodesia was no longer practical with many favouring some form of 'responsible government'. Some favoured responsible government within Southern Rhodesia while others (especially in Matabeleland) favoured membership of the Union of South Africa. Politician Sir Charles Coghlan claimed that such membership with the Union would make Southern Rhodesia the "Ulster of South Africa".

Prior to the referendum, representatives of Southern Rhodesia visited Cape Town where the Prime Minister of South Africa, Jan Smuts, eventually offered terms he considered reasonable and which the United Kingdom government found acceptable. Although opinion among the United Kingdom government, the South African government and the British South Africa Company favoured the union option (and none tried to interfere in the referendum), when the referendum was held the results saw 59.4% in favour of responsible government for a separate colony and 40.6% in favour of joining the Union of South Africa.

Union of South Africa and South West Africa

Background

The inhospitable coast of what is now the Republic of Namibia remained uncolonised up until the end of the 19th century.

From 1874, the leaders of several indigenous peoples, notably Maharero of the Herero nation, approached the Cape Parliament to the south. Anticipating invasion by a European power and already suffering Portuguese encroachment from the north and Afrikaner encroachment from the south, these leaders approached the Cape Colony government to discuss the possibility of accession and the political representation it would entail. Accession to the Cape Colony, a self-governing state with a system of multi-racial franchise and legal protection for traditional land rights, was at the time considered marginally preferable to annexation by either the Kingdom of Portugal or the German Empire.

In response, the Cape Parliament appointed a special Commission under William Palgrave, to travel to the territory between the Orange and Cunene rivers and to confer with these leaders regarding accession to the Cape. In the negotiations with the Palgrave Commission, some indigenous nations such as the Damara and the Herero responded positively (October 1876), other reactions were mixed. Discussions regarding the magisterial structure for the area's political integration into the Cape dragged on until, from 1876, it was blocked by Britain. Britain relented, insofar as allowing the Cape to incorporate Walvis Bay as an exclave, which was brought under the magisterial district of Cape Town, but when the Germans established a protectorate over the area in 1884, South West Africa was predominantly autonomous.

Thereafter, South West Africa became a German colony, except for Walvis Bay and the Offshore Islands which remained part of the Cape, outside of German control.

South African occupation

Following the outbreak of the First World War in 1914, the Union of South Africa occupied and annexed the German colony of German South West Africa. With the establishment of the League of Nations and cessation of the war, South Africa obtained a Class C Mandate to administer South West Africa "under the laws of the mandatory (South Africa) as integral portions of its territory". Subsequently, the Union of South Africa generally regarded South West Africa as a fifth province, although this was never an official status.

With the creation of the United Nations, the Union applied for the incorporation of South West Africa, but its application was rejected by the U.N., which invited South Africa to prepare a Trusteeship agreement instead. This invitation was in turn rejected by the Union, which subsequently did not modify the administration of South West Africa and continued to adhere to the original mandate. This caused a complex set of legal wranglings that were not finalised when the Union was replaced with the Republic of South Africa. In 1949, the Union passed a law bringing South West Africa into closer association with it including giving South West Africa representation in the South African parliament.

Walvis Bay, which is now in Namibia, was originally a part of the Union of South Africa as an exclave as it was a part of the Cape Colony at the time of Unification. In 1921 Walvis Bay was integrated with the Class C Mandate over South West Africa for the rest of the Union's duration and for part of the republican era.

Statute of Westminster

The Statute of Westminster passed by the British Parliament in December 1931, which repealed the Colonial Laws Validity Act and implemented the Balfour Declaration 1926, had a profound impact on the constitutional structure and status of the Union. The most notable effect was that the South African Parliament was released from many restrictions concerning the handling of the so-called "native question". However, the repeal was not sufficient to enable the South African Parliament to ignore the entrenched clauses of its constitution (the South Africa Act) which led to the coloured-vote constitutional crisis of the 1950s wherein the right of coloureds to vote in the main South African Parliament was removed and replaced with a separate, segregated, and largely powerless assembly.

Military

The military of the Union of South Africa was the Union Defence Force (UDF) until 1957, when it became the South African Defence Force.

Flags/Coats of arms

See also

 South West Africa

Notes

References

Bibliography

 Beck, Roger B. The History of South Africa (Greenwood, 2000).
 Davenport, Thomas, and Christopher Saunders. South Africa: A modern history (Springer, 2000).
 Eze, M. Intellectual history in contemporary South Africa (Springer, 2016).
 
 Ross, Robert. A Concise History of South Africa (2009)
 Thompson, Leonard, and Lynn Berat. A History of South Africa (4th ed. 2014)
 Thompson, Leonard. The Unification of South Africa 1902 – 1910 (Oxford UP, 1960).
 Welsh, Frank. A History of South Africa (2000).

External links

1910 establishments in Africa
1910 establishments in South Africa
1910 establishments in the British Empire
1910s in South Africa
1920s in South Africa
1930s in South Africa
1940s in South Africa
1950s in South Africa
1960s in South Africa
1961 disestablishments in Africa
1961 disestablishments in South Africa
1961 disestablishments in the British Empire
20th century in South Africa
Articles containing video clips
Defunct organisations based in South Africa
Former British colonies and protectorates in Africa
Former Commonwealth realms
Former countries in Africa
Former monarchies
Former monarchies of Africa
History of South Africa
Political history of South Africa
South Africa and the Commonwealth of Nations
States and territories disestablished in 1961
States and territories established in 1910
White supremacy in Africa